Dolaz cheese is a traditional cheese produced from whey by nomad (Karakoyunlu, Hayta, Honamlı, Sarıkeçili Yörüks) in the Lakes region (Isparta, Afyon and Antalya) in Turkey. It is generally made from ewe's and goat's milk.

See also
 Turkish cuisine

References

Sheep's-milk cheeses
Goat's-milk cheeses
Turkish cheeses